So Much Staying Alive and Lovelessness is the fifth full-length album by Joan of Arc, released in 2003 by Jade Tree Records. Initially envisioned as a double-album, tracks recorded during the same sessions as So Much... were instead released as In Rape Fantasy and Terror Sex We Trust later that year.

Track listing
 On A Bedsheet In The Breeze On The Roof - 6:17
 The Infinite Blessed Yes - 4:27
 Perfect Need And Perfect Completion - 5:35
 Olivia Lost - 5:16
 Diane Cool And Beautiful - 3:43
 Mr. Participation Billy - 2:20
 Mean To March - 4:48
 Hello Goodnight Good Morning Goodbye - 2:45
 Dead Together - 4:08
 Madelleine Laughing - 4:14
 Staying Alive And Lovelessness - 3:08

References

Joan of Arc (band) albums
2003 albums
Jade Tree (record label) albums